Otto Emil Ravn (30 November 1881, Aalborg – 18 November 1952, Skovshoved) was a Danish Assyriologist and professor at the University of Copenhagen.

References 

1881 births
1952 deaths
People from Aalborg
Danish Assyriologists
Academic staff of the University of Copenhagen